Kokou may refer to:

Kokou (god)
Kokou, Burkina Faso